Goodwin Wharton (8 March 1653 – 28 October 1704) was an English Whig politician and autobiographer, as well as an avid mystic, alchemist and treasure hunter. His unpublished manuscript autobiography, in the British Library, "ranks high in the annals of psychopathology" according to the historian Roy Porter.

Early life
Goodwin Wharton was the third and youngest son out of the seven children of Philip Wharton, 4th Baron Wharton and Jane Goodwin, daughter and heiress of Arthur Goodwin (died 1643), of Upper Winchendon, Buckinghamshire. He was privately educated in France and attended a Protestant academy in Caen in 1663–64. In public and family life he was overshadowed by his forceful older brother, Thomas Wharton, 1st Marquess of Wharton and Malmesbury.

Elected a member of Parliament for East Grinstead in 1680, he made a hot-headed speech in favour of excluding the Duke of York (later James II) from the throne and had to go into hiding for a time.

Fairies and visions
Wharton sent two expeditions to Tobermory to try to raise a galleon from the Spanish Armada wrecked there. Some of his singularly unsuccessful treasure-hunting was done on the advice of a lover, the self-professed medium Mary Parish, who claimed to have placed him in contact with fairies. The soldier-politician John Wildman also became fascinated by Parish's predictions in 1684.

In the following year, Wharton began to receive messages that ostensibly came directly from God and several of his angels. Many of these concerned the prospect of seducing a number of women, including his stepmother, Anne Carr Popham. He claimed to have had an affair with his sister-in-law, the poet Anne Wharton, in the early 1680s. He never married, but he was persuaded by Parish that Hezekiah Knowles, the son of an associate of hers, was his illegitimate son.

Admiralty lord
Wharton's mental instability seems to have gone unnoticed outside his family circle, but he was out of favour under James II for his pronounced Whiggery, despite making representations to his consort, Mary of Modena (and fantasizing about having an affair with her). With the Glorious Revolution he rose to some eminence and was commissioned a lieutenant colonel of cavalry.

Wharton inherited Buckinghamshire estates on his father's death in 1696. He had been elected to Parliament again in 1690, and sat successively for Westmoreland, Malmesbury, Cockermouth, and the shire of Buckinghamshire until his death. He was one of the Lords Commissioners of the Admiralty in 1697–99. He suffered a stroke in 1698, which ended his public career.

References

1653 births
1704 deaths
17th-century English writers
17th-century English male writers
English alchemists
English army officers
English autobiographers
English MPs 1679
English MPs 1689–1690
English MPs 1690–1695
English MPs 1695–1698
English MPs 1698–1700
English MPs 1701
English MPs 1701–1702
English MPs 1702–1705
Lords of the Admiralty
Mystics
Treasure hunters
Whig (British political party) MPs
Younger sons of barons
17th-century alchemists
18th-century alchemists